Joseon Exorcist is a South Korean historical-supernatural television series. The series, directed by Shin Kyung-soo and written by Park Gye-ok, stars Jang Dong-yoon, Park Sung-hoon and Kam Woo-sung. The series follows the fight of the royal family to protect people from the evil spirits, who use human frailties to demolish Joseon. The first two episodes aired on SBS TV on March 22 and 23, 2021, at 22:00 (KST)
before being canceled due to historical inaccuracies and Chinese props present in the series that resulted in backlash from many Korean viewers.

Synopsis
The series follows the story of King Taejong and his two sons, Prince Chungnyung and Prince Yangnyeong, how they fight the evil spirits who came alive and must be exorcised to save Joseon. The founding rulers of Joseon have taken help of the demons and the monsters to overthrow Goryeo. Later the undead return to target the royal family.

Cast

Main
 Jang Dong-yoon as Prince Chungnyung
 Park Sung-hoon as Prince Yangnyeong
 Hong Dong-young as young Prince Yangnyeong
 Kam Woo-sung as King Taejong
 Kim Dong-jun as Byeo Ri
 Jung Hye-sung as Moo Hwa, a shaman
 Lee Yu-bi as Eo-ri, a woman who's loved by the crown prince
 Keum Sae-rok as Hye-yoom, Byeo-ri's co-worker
 Seo Young-hee as Queen Wongyeong

Supporting
 Min Jin-woong as Ing-choon, a rope walker who works with Byeo-ri and Hye-yoom
 Min Sung-wook as Park Seo-bang
 Moon Woo-jin as Grand Prince Kang-nyeong
 Hong Woo-jin as Hong Seok-joong, guardian of King Taejong
 Han Kyu-won as Hong Min-je
 Oh Eui-shik as Ji Gyeom
 Baek Eun-hye as Minister Ha's daughter-in-law
 Seo Dong-won as Marco, an interpreter
 Jeon Seung-hun
 Park Seo-yeon as Chae Yi
 Darcy Paquet as Father John (Yohan)
 David Lee McInnis as Father Nicholas

Special appearances
 Park Hyuk-kwon
 Choi Moo-sung as Mak-chi
 Joo Suk-Tae
 Kim Beop-Rae as Wang Yoo

Production

Casting
In April 2020, it was announced that Jang Dong-yoon would star in the series. In September 2020, he was joined by Park Sung-hoon, Kim Dong-jun, Jung Hye-sung, and Lee Yu-bi. In November 2020, Kam Woo-sung officially joined the main cast. The final lineup was confirmed the same month.

Filming
On November 23, 2020, filming was halted after it was reported that a member of the cast tested positive for COVID-19. Leading actors self-isolated for precaution. Jang Dong-yoon was injured after falling off a horse while filming on December 29. On February 26, 2021 it was reported that Lee Yu-bi injured her ligament while shooting for drama.

Controversy and cancellation
After the airing of the first two episodes, many viewers criticized the content of the series for historical inaccuracies. Korean and Chinese viewers were angered over the usage of Chinese-style props for a show set during the Joseon dynasty. A scene in the first episode depicted King Taejong slaughtering innocent villagers after having a hallucination of his deceased father, King Taejo. There was no historical basis for such an incident. And Prince Chungnyung (Sejong the Great) is treated like a servant by an interpreter (with father John) from China. The Jeonju Lee Royal Family Association, made up of descendants of Joseon’s royal family, criticized the series for its depiction of King Taejong, Prince Yangnyeong, and Prince Chungnyeong, and called for immediate cancellation of the show.  Over 216,000 people also petitioned the Blue House to cancel the show. More than 3,900 complaints were sent to the Korea Communications Standards Commission concerning the television show. On March 24, 2021, the production company and the broadcaster SBS apologized for the historical inaccuracies. They promised to remove the controversial portions and initially said that they would take a break for one week to change the content. Due to the public backlash, corporate sponsors, such as Samsung Electronics and LG Household & Health Care, pulled their ads and cut their ties with the show. Local governments also withdrew their support for the production. On March 26, 2021, the SBS announced that the show was canceled after the first two episodes due to the intense public backlash and the withdrawal of support from corporate sponsors and local governments.

Petition to bring the series to online streaming platforms
It was reported that the international fans of the drama are petitioning for Joseon Exorcist to be broadcast on online streaming platforms like Netflix, iQIYI and Viu.

Viewership

References

External links
 

Seoul Broadcasting System television dramas
2021 South Korean television series debuts
2021 South Korean television series endings
Korean-language television shows
Alternate history television series
Television series set in the Joseon dynasty
Television series by YG Entertainment
South Korean fantasy television series
Television productions suspended due to the COVID-19 pandemic
Unfinished creative works